Gnarls Barkley are an American soul duo, composed of singer-songwriter CeeLo Green and producer Danger Mouse. They released their debut studio album, St. Elsewhere, in 2006. It contained their hit single "Crazy", which peaked at number two on the US Hot 100 and topped the UK Singles Chart. It was nominated at the 2007 Grammy Awards for Record of the Year, and was platinum certified for shipping over 1,000,000 records. St. Elsewhere also received a nomination for Album of the Year. The Odd Couple, their second studio album, was scheduled for release in April 2008, but due to a leak of the album over the internet, they decided to release it early. The album in its entirety received similarly positive reviews.

History

Background
CeeLo Green first entered the scene as part of the Atlanta hip hop group Goodie Mob which had a large hand in the Dirty South movement of the 1990s. Green left the group after their third album in 1999 and started his solo career. That year he sang on "Do You Like the Way" along with Lauryn Hill on Santana's multi-platinum Supernatural album.

Brian Joseph Burton, better known by his stage name Danger Mouse, has produced albums for a number of hip hop and rock artists, including Gorillaz' Demon Days, and The Black Keys' Attack & Release, El Camino, and Turn Blue. He received international attention for his mash-up The Grey Album, which blended the a cappella edition of Jay-Z's The Black Album with samples from The Beatles' White Album.

The duo first crossed paths while Green was performing at the University of Georgia and Danger Mouse won a contest to DJ. They became musical partners and worked together on the songs that would become St. Elsewhere; prior to the release of that album they collaborated on the songs "What You Sittin' On?" for Lex Records in 2004, and "Benzie Box" from the Danger Doom album The Mouse and the Mask in 2005.

Band name
In 2006, Sanjiv Bhattacharya interviewed the duo for The Guardian and asked about where their band name came from, to which Green replied: "You ask me why we're called Gnarls Barkley and I'm asking you 'why not?'...The name Gnarls Barkley isn't anchored down. It's a drifter. A High Plains drifter, I might add". Danger Mouse said: "There's no story behind it...The name doesn't have anything to do with anything". Although many people believe that their name has something to do with former NBA player Charles Barkley; when Bhattacharya asked them about it, Danger Mouse replied: "Nope. It's just like everything else on this record. There was no conscious decision about stuff".

According to a Billboard article: "Burton and CeeLo have been cagey about what the name of the act means, and each live performance is an opportunity to play dress-up as tennis players, astronauts and chefs, among many other get-ups. The costuming extends to photo shoots, as Burton and Cee Lo would rather impersonate characters from such films as Back to the Future or Wayne's World." They also have dressed up as characters from films A Clockwork Orange and Napoleon Dynamite.

CeeLo Green said in an interview: That is that electric industrial Euro soul, that's what I call it ... if I can call it anything. It truly is shapeless and formless. My style and my approach is still water, and it runs so deep. So, with that project I got a chance to be a lil' zany, of course a continuation of eccentricity, abstract and vague, and all of those wonderful things that make art exactly what it is. And that's subject to interpretation. As far as the artiste himself, it does cater to and extend the legacy of Cee Lo Green, and showcase the diversity and range and intention of Cee Lo Green. It is a great project that I'm very, very proud of.

St. Elsewhere (2006–2007)
Downtown/Atlantic in the United States and Warners Bros. Records in the United Kingdom signed the band after several songs, including "Crazy", were played for them by Danger Mouse's management company Waxploitation. "Crazy" was released as their first single on April 3, 2006, preceded by its release as digital download and 12" vinyl record single in March 2006. It gained some of its popularity due to its use on primetime BBC Radio 1 DJ Zane Lowe's television advert, and it was also made Record of the Week by Ken Bruce of BBC Radio 2, Scott Mills and Jo Whiley of BBC Radio 1 as well as being made 'Weekend Anthem' by DJ Spoony and Sara Cox (also of Radio 1).

In an interview with journalist Stephen Mooallem about "Crazy", Mooallem asked the duo, "Is it true that Cee-Lo recorded the vocals for "Crazy" in just one take?" to which Danger Mouse replied, "Yeah. He had the words written on paper, and what you hear on the album was the first time he ever tried singing it. He went in and gave it a shot, really just to see what it would sound like. We just kept it because it sounded great." The song was, in addition, considered by the duo to be an "independent joint venture," paid for entirely "out-of-pocket." Catapulting the two into stardom, the single was primarily responsible for their success, as they "didn't even have a formal deal in place" until the song hit No. 1.

In the United Kingdom, "Crazy" became the first ever single to top the UK Singles Chart purely on download sales as it was released online a week before it was released as a CD single. It was also the first single to top the UK Singles Chart for nine weeks consecutively since 1994 when Wet Wet Wet's "Love Is All Around" was number one for fifteen weeks (the last song to spend exactly nine weeks on top was "Two Tribes" by Frankie Goes to Hollywood in 1984). It has also equaled the Queen 1975 classic "Bohemian Rhapsody", which also topped the UK Singles Chart for nine weeks. Gnarls Barkley announced that as the record had spent its ninth week at number one, it was to be deleted as a vinyl/CD listing from May 28, 2006, so people will "remember the song fondly and not get sick of it".
"Crazy" is also the longest number-one on the UK Official Download Chart with its stay lasting eleven consecutive weeks. In late 2009 the song was voted as the best song of the decade by Rolling Stone magazine.

The group released their debut album, St. Elsewhere, on April 24, 2006, in the United Kingdom and on May 9, 2006, in their native United States. For their American television debut on Late Night with Conan O'Brien, May 24, 2006, the band performed "Crazy".

They performed along with Christina Aguilera, AFI, and Wolfmother at the MTV Movie Awards 2006 on June 8, 2006. They were dressed as characters from the film series Star Wars. Rebel Alliance pilots, Imperial officers, Stormtroopers, Chewbacca, Jango Fett, Obi-Wan, with Cee-Lo singing as an unmasked Darth Vader.

In October 2006, Gnarls Barkley recorded a live session for Live from Abbey Road at Abbey Road Studios.

St. Elsewhere has been certified Platinum by the RIAA for selling over 1,000,000 albums in the United States. A limited edition deluxe package of St. Elsewhere was released on November 7, 2006. The CD+DVD package includes a 92-page booklet, four music videos and bonus songs from live performance.

St. Elsewhere was nominated for four Grammy Awards in 2007 including for Record of the Year, and Album of the Year, winning two of them for Best Alternate Music Album, and Best Urban/Alternate Performance for "Crazy".

"Crazy" was featured in a couple of TV shows and movies, like The Big Short, Medium, Kick-Ass, I Think I Love My Wife, Religulous, Cold Case, How to Rock, Grey's Anatomy, Boyhood, and It's Always Sunny in Philadelphia.

From January until March 2007, they toured with the Red Hot Chili Peppers through the U.S.

They did a collaborative short film in both the Spring of 2006 and 2007 with the international TV series Kung Faux which airs heavily on Channel V around the world, and they also toured Australia in March and April 2007 as part of the Channel V Festival.

The Odd Couple (2008)
In early March 2008, the duo's second album, The Odd Couple, was leaked over the internet prompting the duo to push the release date up from April 8. In an interview with Entertainment Magazine, Danger Mouse said that he "knew it [the leak] was coming...every day, I expected to get a call saying it leaked, and eventually I got a call saying it leaked." On March 18, 2008, the album became available via download on the iTunes Store and Amazon MP3. Hard copies of the album were released on March 25.

Prior to its official release, Green spoke to the album's anti-formulaic qualities, noting bluntly that "there's no formula to it," and that to expect the same wild success of St. Elsewhere is to neglect the ever-present "risk factor in any artistic endeavor." He called it something of an "act of faith" – a true, earnest attempt to create and disseminate a piece of art to those who would seek out its conception.

They appeared as the musical guest on the April 12, 2008 episode of NBC's Saturday Night Live. They were supposed to be in a Digital Short parodying amateur music videos according to the scrolled text but only appeared in the singing performances of the live broadcast.

On November 11, 2008, they released an EP, Who's Gonna Save My Soul, featuring four versions of the song which originally appeared on The Odd Couple, along with a live version of "Neighbors" and a previously unreleased song, "Mystery Man." A music video for "Mystery Man" was directed by Walter Robot and premiered on Yahoo! Music.

Third studio album (2013–present)
In 2013, Green stated they would be releasing a third album sometime in the future. In late 2017, Green stated "We have already started on a new [Gnarls Barkley] album, we're halfway in and we have some overtures from the other projects that may not have stood the test of time, we don't know yet." In July 2020, he revealed that the COVID-19 lockdown happened as he was working on this third effort.

Discography 

 St. Elsewhere (2006)
 The Odd Couple (2008)

Awards
BET Awards

|-
| rowspan="3" | 2007 || "Crazy" || Video of the Year || 
|-
| rowspan="2" | Gnarls Barkley || Best New Artist || 
|-
| Best Group || 
|-
| 2008 || Gnarls Barkley || Best Group || 

Brit Awards

|-
| rowspan="3" | 2007 || St. Elsewhere || International Album || 
|-
| rowspan="2" | Gnarls Barkley || International Breakthrough Act || 
|-
| International Group || 

Grammy Awards

|-
| rowspan="4" | 2007 || rowspan="2" | St. Elsewhere || Album of the Year || 
|-
| Best Alternative Music Album || 
|-
| rowspan="2" | "Crazy" || Record of the Year || 
|-
| Best Urban/Alternative Performance || 
|-
| 2008 || "Gone Daddy Gone" || Best Music Video || 
|-
| rowspan="3" | 2009 || "Going On" || Best Pop Performance by a Duo or Group with Vocals || 
|-
| "Who's Gonna Save My Soul" || Best Music Video || 
|-
| The Odd Couple || Best Alternative Music Album || 

MTV Europe Music Awards

|-
| rowspan="3" | 2006 || Gnarls Barkley || Future Sound || 
|-
| rowspan="2" | "Crazy" || Best Song || 
|-
| Best Video || 

MTV Video Music Awards

|-
| rowspan="3" | 2006 || rowspan="3" | "Crazy" || Best Group Video || 
|-
| Best Direction || 
|-
| Best Editing || 
|-
| 2007 || "Smiley Face" || Best Editing || 
|-
| rowspan="2" | 2008 || rowspan="2" | "Run (I'm a Natural Disaster)" || Best Choreography || 
|-
| Best Art Direction || 
|-
| rowspan="3" | 2009 || rowspan="3" | "Who's Gonna Save My Soul" || Breakthrough Video || 
|-
| Best Visual Effects || 
|-
| Best Art Direction || 

MTVU Woodie Awards

|-
| rowspan="2" | 2006 || Gnarls Barkley || Left Field Woodie || 
|-
| "Crazy" || Best Video Woodie - Animated || 
|-
| 2008 || "Who's Gonna Save My Soul" || Best Video Woodie || 

NAACP Image Awards

|-
| rowspan="2" | 2007 || Gnarls Barkley || Outstanding Duo or Group || 
|-
| "Crazy" || Outstanding Song || 

Q Awards

|-
| rowspan="2" | 2006 || "Crazy" || Best Track || 
|-
| "Smiley Face" || Best Video || 

Soul Train Music Awards

|-
| rowspan="2" | 2007 || St. Elsewhere || Best R&B/Soul Album – Group, Band or Duo || 
|-
| "Crazy" || Best R&B/Soul Single – Group, Band or Duo || 

Teen Choice Awards

|-
| rowspan="2" | 2006 || Gnarls Barkley || Choice Music: Male Breakout Artist || 
|-
| "Crazy" || Choice Music: Summer Song || 

 2009 Rolling Stone 100 Best Songs of the Decade – No. 1 "Crazy"

See also
 Broken Bells
 Gnarls Biggie

References

External links

 

Grammy Award winners
Musical groups established in 2003
Atlantic Records artists
Musical groups from Georgia (U.S. state)
African-American musical groups
American musical duos
American soul musical groups
Alternative rock groups from Georgia (U.S. state)
MTV Europe Music Award winners
Downtown Records artists
2003 establishments in Georgia (U.S. state)